This is a list of current Ion Mystery affiliates (formerly known as Escape until September 30, 2019, and Court TV Mystery until February 24, 2022), arranged by U.S. state. There are links to and articles on each of the stations, describing their local programming, hosts and technical information, such as broadcast frequencies. In most markets, Ion Mystery operates on a digital subchannel of the main station listed. In some markets, it operates on an LPTV or Class A station.

Current affiliates
 1 Indicates station is a primary feed Ion Mystery affiliate.

List of former affiliates

References

Lists of American television network affiliates
Ion Mystery affiliates